Michael Anthony Mary Quinn (31 May 1952) is a former rugby union footballer who played international rugby as a fly-half for Ireland. He played schools rugby for Newbridge College and captained them to victory in the 1970 Schools Cup Final over Blackrock College RFC. He then moved on to play senior rugby for Lansdowne Football Club before earning a call up to the Ireland national team. In 1976 he was a member of the Ireland squad that went on tour of New Zealand and Fiji.

His family once owned the H Williams chain of supermarkets, which was later sold to Quinnsworth and subsequently to Tesco Ireland.

References

External links
Lansdowne Football Club - Hall of Fame - Michael Quinn

1952 births
People educated at Newbridge College
Irish rugby union players
Ireland international rugby union players
Lansdowne Football Club players
Leinster Rugby players
Rugby union fly-halves
Living people